Raymond D. Rawson is a former State Senator within the State of Nevada, serving from 1985 to 2001. He is known for providing forensic evidence that led to the wrongful imprisonment of Ray Krone.

Rawson was born in Utah and attended the University of Nevada, Las Vegas and Loma Linda University Dental School. He is a dentist and a visiting professor of General Practice Residency at the University of Nevada, Las Vegas School of Dental Medicine, where he teaches a course in forensic dentistry.

References

1940 births
Living people
Nevada Republicans
University of Nevada, Las Vegas alumni
Loma Linda University alumni